Cruger may refer to:

 Cruger (surname)
 Cruger, Mississippi, United States
 Cruger-Tchula Academy
 Cruger Township, Woodford County, Illinois
 Cruger, Illinois, United States

See also
 Crüger (disambiguation)
 Crugers, New York
 Kruger